Zon Murray (April 13, 1910 – February 2, 1979) was an American actor.

Filmography
He appeared in the films: The El Paso Kid, Ghost of Hidden Valley, Song of the Sierras, Jack Armstrong, Rainbow Over the Rockies, West of Dodge City, The Law Comes to Gunsight, Code of the Saddle, Trail of the Mounties, Oklahoma Blues, False Paradise, Grand Canyon Trail, Blood on the Moon, Crossed Trails,  Gun Law Justice, Trails End, Son of a Bad Man, Grand Canyon, The House Across the Street, Captain China, The Kid from Texas, Night Riders of Montana, Along the Great Divide, Fort Worth, Hurricane Island, Oklahoma Justice, Pecos River, Border Saddlemates, Laramie Mountains, Montana Territory, Carson City, Cripple Creek, Old Overland Trail, Born to the Saddle, On Top of Old Smoky, The President's Lady, The Farmer Takes a Wife, Down Laredo Way, The Great Adventures of Captain Kidd, Vigilante Terror, Motorcycle Gang, Escape from Red Rock, Gunsmoke in Tucson and Requiem for a Gunfighter, among others.

Private life
He was married to Dorothy J. Sands (1911–1981); they had two sons: Gary Zon Murray and Rickey Murray.

References

External links
 

1910 births
1979 deaths
Actors from St. Joseph, Missouri
20th-century American male actors
American male film actors